Precious Lee is an American model. She has gained prominence as one of few Black curve models to work with longstanding fashion houses. She has walked for Versace, Moschino, Fendi, and others.

Early life 
Lee was born and raised in Atlanta, Georgia. Her father, Rudy, is a businessman and cosmetologist and her mother, Anita, is a teacher. She has one older sister, Charisma, who died in a car accident when Lee was a child.

Lee was an active student and participated in competitive cheerleading, Girl Scouts, student government, debate club, thespian club, and concert band. In her high school years she was crowned homecoming queen. She enjoyed fashion from her youth and was particularly inspired by her parents' attire.

Career 
Lee began modeling at age 18 as a student at Clark Atlanta University, when she attended an open call for an agency and received a contract offer. She started her career doing catalog shoots and modeled part-time as an undergraduate. Lee moved to New York after college to pursue modeling full-time after signing with Ford Models, with plans to attend law school if her modeling career did not pan out. She named Crystal Renn and Toccara Jones as "curve" models (those bigger than sample size) who inspired her.

She walked in her first fashion show in 2017 for Christian Siriano. She has walked during New York Fashion Week for Siriano, Tommy Hilfiger, Balmain, Versace, Michael Kors, and Moschino. She has also modeled couture for Jean Paul Gaultier, and she has a long-term partnership with Marina Rinaldi. She has covered Vogue, British Vogue, and Harper's Bazaar. Lee fulfilled a lifelong aspiration when she walked in the spring 2021 Versace show and was one of three curve models to do so for the first time in the history of the brand.

Lee made her acting debut in 2021 on the STARZ series Run the World. She was also a guest judge on Project Runway.

In 2023, Lee starred in the music video of "Spin Bout U" by rappers Drake and 21 Savage.

Personal life 
Lee is interested in screenwriting and is working on a screenplay.

Accolades 
 Nominee, 2020 Breakout Star, Models.com
 Nominee, 2021 Model of the Year, Models.com

References

External links 
 Official Instagram
 Precious Lee at Models.com

Year of birth missing (living people)
Living people
African-American models
21st-century African-American women
People from Atlanta
Clark Atlanta University alumni
American female models
Plus-size models
IMG Models models
Female models from Georgia (U.S. state)